Rajpur is a town and a nagar panchayat in Barwani district in the Indian state of Madhya Pradesh. Integrated Border Check Post at Agra Mumbai Highway run by Government of Madhya Pradesh is at Balsamud in Rajpur tehsil.

Geography
It has an average elevation of 225 metres (738 feet).

Demographics
 India census, Rajpur had a population of 17,913. Males constitute 51% of the population and females 49%. Rajpur has an average literacy rate of 59%, lower than the national average of 59.5%: male literacy is 68%, and female literacy is 49%. In Rajpur, 17% of the population is under 6 years of age.

Temples
In Rajpur there are many temples. Some of the famous temples names are Bhawani mata temple, Triveni Temple, Hanuman temple., Saiyad Mahar Ali Shah Sarkaar Dargah.

Places to visit
Roseshwar dham is the famous place near Rajpur. It is situated on the hill and 5 km from Rajpur. Here two temples are also present. One is shiv temple, other is navgrah temple.

References

Cities and towns in Barwani district
Barwani